Anil Adhikari (30 May 1987 – 14 January 2017) better known by his stage name Yama Buddha was a Nepalese rapper based in London, UK. He is widely considered one of the most influential rappers of Nepalese hip-hop & often referred as "King of Nephop". His songs Sathi, Aama, Aaudai chhu ma, Yo Prasanga, Antya Ko Suruwat, etc. are popular hits. He was the creator and the presenter of the popular Rap Battle show Raw Barz.

Early life 
Yama Buddha was born on 30 May 1987 in Salakpur, Morang, Nepal to politician Ambika Prasad Adhikari and Urmila Adhikari as Anil Adhikari. He lived in Salakpur, Morang for some years and moved to Kathmandu with his parents. He went back to stay with his grandparents in Salakpur for about 2 years and studied grades 4 and 5 at Pathibhara Boarding school in Itahari. He went back to Kathmandu to study in grade 6 at The Excelsior School Swoyambhu. He completed his SLC from The Excelsior School and his +2 from Ed Mark Academy.

Personal life
Yama Buddha moved to the UK in 2009 and again returned backed after some months. He later on married his long time Nepalese-British girlfriend Asmita Sedhai in 2013 and moved back to North London, United Kingdom with her. He was found dead in his bathroom on 14 January 2017.

Discography

Mixtapes 
 Yama Buddha (2011)
 Intro 
 Asaarko Bhel 
 Blueberry Pie 
 Don't Ask About My Music 
 Final Fantasy feat. Dougie 
 Sometimes (Thugz Mansion Remix) 
 You Just Play 
 Mama Told Me 
 Ma Futchhu Tara Jhukdina 
 Hinsaako Kaalo maadal
 I'm Fresh, I'm Fly 
 In My Soul feat. Lazy Boi, Dougie & Duke 
 Crack Raps 
 Grime 
 Grab Ya Khukuri 
 Yo Prasanga 
 Let It Go feat. Duke 
 I Represent 
 Battle Ready feat. Dougie & Duke 
 Saathi
 Outro 
 Yama Buddha II (2013)
 Intro 
 Mic Check 001 
 Ghattekulo-32 
 I Will Go 
 Change Up 
 Mic Check 002 
 Kathmandu Ko Thito 
 Timi Malai 
 Malai Kohi feat. Kristina Allen 
 Narunu Timi 
 Didi 
 Foothpath Mero Ghar (Bonus Track) 
 Raachhyas (Bonus Track)

Albums
 Ekadesh (2012)
 Intro feat. Rodit Bhandari 
 Aama feat. Mistah K
 Challenge
 Yo Prasanga
 Antya Ko Suruwat feat. Leezum Bhutia
 Pagalpan
 Jutta Maa
 Kohi feat. Aidray & Nattu
 KTM Grime
 Gtfoh feat. Trisha
 Think Smart
 Gimme That Beat
 Khatra (album) (Prod. by Nasty) (2017)
 Taaj 
 Paisa 
 Khatra 
 Sapana 
 Allarey Thita 
 Yodda 
 K Vako Hola

Singles 
List of singles as lead artist

 "Aaudai Chu Ma"
 "Real"
 "Sipahi" feat. Saugat
 "Timro Laagi" feat. Yodda & Brisk Timos
 "Know Me"
 "Get Back"
 "Hamro Barey Ma" feat. Mc Flo
 "Moist"
 "Freeverse"
 "Freeverse 001"
 "Freeverse 002"
 "Freeverse 003"
 "Freeverse 004"

Cyphers 
 "XCLUSIVE CYPHER" (with Mastermind,Bri$k Timos and So Deep)
The Top (Nephop Cypher) with Manas Ghale)

Featured artist 
 "Ma Hoon Yatri" (with Mc Flo & Mac)
 "Raachhyas" (with Hakim & Soda)
 "The Top" (with Loorey, Duke, Dougie)
 "Tito Satya" (with Manas Ghale)
 "Mukhauta OST" (with Rabin Shrestha & The Sign Band)
 "Aawaran" (with Priyanka Karki)
 "Grown Man" (with Mani Sing)
 "Get Down" (with Manas Ghale)
 "Nachna" (with IRAJ, Chingy, Neha Kakkar & Tony T) 
 "Kalakaar" (with Sugam Pokhrel & Girish Khatiwada)
 "Kathmandu`s finest" (With Nasty)
 "Brick City" (Street Rap) (with Aid Ray)
 "Alone in the dark" (with Def'Mind)
 "Turn the lights off" (with MistaH K, Duke and Bigshake)
 "Fire with Fire Remix" (with Jay Key, Emma Walsh and LA Cloud )
 "Ek Karodma Ek Ma -B-boying (Ncell) (with Sugam Pokhrel)
 "Recital" (With Nasty)

Death
Yama Buddha died on 14 January 2017 in London. The singer was found dead in his bathroom at around 6 AM. It was reported that the singer committed suicide at his residence in North London.

Legacy
Unlike other Nepalese raps, Yama Buddha's songs are based on eclectic affairs. 'Saathi', 'Footpath Mero Ghar' and 'Yo Prasanga' depicts the real problems faced by Nepalese society such as poverty, drug addiction, sex trafficking and homelessness.  Songs on relationships are 'Ama (Mother)', 'Didi (Sister)', 'Pagalpan (Madness)'. Similarly, famous songs on other various narratives by Yama Buddha include 'Jutta ma', 'Audai chu ma' (for the movie Talak Jung Tulke), Aawaran (co Priyanka Karki). He also collaborated with artists Iraj, Chingy and Neha Kakkar in 'Nachana'. He frequently performed live abroad (among Nepali diaspora) in countries such as India, Australia, UK etc.

References

External links
 

1987 births
21st-century Nepalese male singers
People from Morang District
Suicides by hanging in England
Nepalese hip hop singers
Grime music artists
Nepalese emigrants to the United Kingdom
2017 suicides